Diego Cortés Padilla (born 18 June 1998) is a Mexican professional footballer who plays as a right-back for Atlético Morelia on loan from Guadalajara.

International career
Cortés was called up for the 2017 FIFA U-20 World Cup.

Honours
Mexico U17
CONCACAF U-17 Championship: 2015

References

External links

1998 births
Living people
Mexican footballers
Mexican expatriate footballers
Footballers from Guadalajara, Jalisco
Association football midfielders
Atlético Morelia players
C.D. Guadalajara footballers
Club Atlético Zacatepec players
CD Tudelano footballers
Liga MX players
Segunda División B players
Mexican expatriate sportspeople in Spain
Expatriate footballers in Spain
Mexico under-20 international footballers